is a Japanese multimedia project by King Records under their Evil Line Records label. The characters were designed by Idea Factory under their Otomate label, with Yuichiro Momose as the main scenario writer. The project features eighteen voice actors and is centered on rap battles, with fans voting for their preferred team. The CDs have ranked high on mainstream music charts and the franchise has grown to include manga adaptations, stageplay adaptions, a mobile game, and an anime.

Plot

After war, women have taken over ruling politics in the Chuo ward and have banned and destroyed weapons. This has caused men to fight through rap battles using Hypnosis Mics, which can be used to affect people's sympathetic nerves and influence their thought process. However, the legendary rap group, The Dirty Dawg, has split up into four groups, each representing a division of Tokyo, Japan and engaging in territorial battles using words and the Hypnosis Mics.

Discography

Beginning in 2017, each group released an introductory single. In April 2018, the first Battle Season began, and each first press edition of the rap battle albums came with a voting card. Mad Trigger Crew and Matenro were the finalists. Matenro won the battle held in December 2018 and released a celebratory album titled The Champion, produced by Zeebra.

In 2019, Bad Ass Temple debuted with the album Bad Ass Temple Funky Sounds, which was produced by Nobodyknows. The song "Sōgyaran Bam" was written by Diggy-Mo.

Lives

Media

Game
On September 9, 2018, a smartphone game Hypnosis Mic: Alternative Rap Battle was announced by video game developer and publisher Idea Factory. The game was slated for a December 2019 release, but was then announced to be delayed until March 2020 to improve the quality of the app. Kazui is the character designer for the smartphone game, while Yuichiro Momose will be the scenario writer. The game was officially released March 26, 2020 on iOS and Android. The game's original story is set in the "Alternative Rap Battle" held by the Chuo Ward. The main character (player) starts as an apprentice DJ participating in the alternative rap battle. In the game, you can also play a rhythm game called "KILLER SCRATCH !!" and play Hypnosis Mic songs.

Manga
Original work by EVIL LINE RECORDS, Scenario written by Momose Yūichirō.

Hypnosis Mic -Before the Battle- The Dirty Dawg
Hypnosis Mic -Before the Battle- The Dirty Dawg, which focuses on all the former members of The Dirty Dawg, began serializing in Kodansha's Shonen Magazine Edge January 2019 issue (released December 17, 2018) to the August 2020 issue (released on July 17, 2020), and was illustrated by Rui Karasuduki.

Hypnosis Mic -Division Rap Battle- Side B.B. & M.T.C
Hypnosis Mic -Division Rap Battle- Side B.B. & M.T.C, which focuses on Buster Bros!!! and Mad Trigger Crew, was serialized in Kodansha's Monthly Shōnen Sirius from the February 2019 issue (released on December 26, 2018) to the May 2020 issue (released on March 26, 2020).

Hypnosis Mic -Division Rap Battle- Side F.P & M
Hypnosis Mic -Division Rap Battle- Side F.P & M, which focuses on Fling Posse and Matenro, began running in Ichijinsha's Monthly Comic Zero Sum from the February 2019 issue (released on December 28, 2018) to the April 2020 issue (released on February 28, 2020).

Hypnosis Mic -Division Rap Battle- side D.H & B.A.T
Hypnosis Mic -Division Rap Battle- side D.H & B.A.T, which focuses on the Osaka Division Dotsuitare Hompo and Nagoya Division Bad Ass Temple, began serialization in Kodansha's Magazine Pocket app on April 8, 2020.

Hypnosis Mic -Division Rap Battle- Dawn of Divisions
Hypnosis Mic -Division Rap Battle- Dawn of Divisions, Illustration by Rui Karasuduki. Serialized in Kodansha's Shonen Magazine Edge from the February 2021 issue (released January 17, 2021).

Hypnosis Mic -Division Rap Battle- Side B.B and M.T.C +
Hypnosis Mic -Division Rap Battle- Side B.B and M.T.C + began serializing in Kodansha's Monthly Shōnen Sirius from the March 2021 issue (released January 26, 2021).

Hypnosis Mic -Division Rap Battle- Side F.P and M +
Hypnosis Mic -Division Rap Battle- Side F.P and M + began serializing in Ichijinsha's Monthly Comic Zero Sum from the March 2021 issue (released January 28, 2021).

Stage plays
"Hypnosismic -Division Rap Battle-" began performing from November 2019 under the title of Rule the Stage, also known as Hypste (ヒプステ).

All plays were directed by Gō Ueki and written by Shinjirō Kaneda, with Yamadera Kouichi in charge of narration. The ensemble of background dancers includes dancers such as members of the dance vocal group Beat Buddy Boi, as a dance team titled "Division Dance Battle".

Cast (Stage Ver)
 Ikebukuro Division Buster Bros!!!
 Yamada Ichiro（Takano Akira）
 Yamada Jiro（Matsuda Shota）
 Yamada Saburo（Akishima Ryuto）
 Yokohama Division MAD TRIGGER CREW
 Aohitsugi Samatoki（Abe Alan）
 Iruma Jyuto（Mizue Kenta）
 Busujima Mason Rio（Byrnes Yuuki）
 Shibuya Division Fling Posse
 Amemura Ramuda（Sekoguchi Ryo, Yasui Kentaro）
 Yumeno Gentaro（Maeyama Takahisa）
 Arisugawa Dice（Takizawa Ryo）
 Shinjuku Division Matenro
 Jinguji Jakurai（Ayukawa Tayou）
 Izanami Hifumi（Araki Hirofumi）
 Kannonzaka Doppo（Miyagi Kodai）
 Osaka Division Dotsuitare Hompo
 Nurude Sasara（Aramaki Yoshihiko）
 Tsutsujimori Rosho（Satonaka Masamichi）
 Amayado Rei（Higashiyama Yoshihisa）
 Nagoya Division Bad Ass Temple
 Harai Kuko（Hirono Ryota）
 Aimono Jyushi（Kato Daigo）
 Amaguni Hitoya（Aoyagi Ruito）
 Others
 Kannabi Yotsutsuji（Itokawa Yojiro）

Performance Schedule (Stage)

Anime
An anime television series adaptation titled Hypnosis Mic: Division Rap Battle: Rhyme Anima was announced on December 4, 2019. It aired from October 3 to December 26, 2020.

Radio

HYPNOSISRADIO supported by Spotify
 Broadcast on TOKYO FM from October to March 2019. 
 Three times a month, each of the B.B, MTC, Fling Posse, Matenro, Dotsuitare Hompo, and Bad Ass Temple divisions will took turns to serve as radio hosts. Hypnosis Mic music artists were often also guests on the show. The navigator of the program was Daichi Yajima.

Spotify HYPNOSIS WAVE
 Broadcast on J-WAVE from February to September 2021. 
The Ikebukuro, Yokohama, Shibuya, Shinjuku, Osaka, and Nagoya divisions change every month, and one person is in charge of the program on a weekly basis. The navigator is Sascha.

Reception
"Hypnosis Mic: Final Battle" was one of the trending topics on Twitter in Japan during the month of November 2018. In 2018, Hypnosis Mic was the most-followed Twitter account in Japan for voice actors in terms of fan engagement.

Fling Posse VS Matenro ranked #1 in the Oricon Weekly Digital Albums Chart. Mad Trigger Crew VS Matenro also ranked #1 on the Oricon Weekly Digital Albums Chart during its first week of release, with approximately 8,000 downloads.

Matenro's album, The Champion, ranked #1 in digital album sales on Oricon on its first week of release, with approximately 9,000 downloads.

The January 2019 issue of Shonen Magazine Edge, where Hypnosis Mic: Division Rap Battle: Before the Battle: The Dirty Dawg debuted, unexpectedly sold out upon manga release.

Awards and nominations

References

External links
  

2017 establishments in Japan
2020 video games
Android (operating system) games
Animated musical groups
Ichijinsha manga
IOS games
Japanese boy bands
Japanese idols in anime and manga
Japanese musical groups
Japanese rappers
King Records (Japan) artists
Kodansha manga
Music video games
Musical groups established in 2017
Shōjo manga
Shōnen manga
Video games developed in Japan